Kazimierz Barcikowski (22 March 1927 – 10 July 2007) was a Polish politician. As a member of Polish United Workers Party, he served on the Central Committee of the Party and on the Political Bureau. Among his other posts were those of deputy to Sejm and minister of agriculture. Barcikowski served as head of government negotiations with striking workers in Szczecin in 1980 and was one of four deputy chairmen of the Polish Council of State from 1985 to 1989.

References

Robert Gillette, "Poland Completes Leadership Reshuffle," Los Angeles Times, 13 November 1985

1927 births
2007 deaths
People from Mińsk County
People from Warsaw Voivodeship (1919–1939)
Members of the Politburo of the Polish United Workers' Party
Government ministers of Poland
Members of the Polish Sejm 1965–1969
Members of the Polish Sejm 1969–1972
Members of the Polish Sejm 1980–1985
Members of the Polish Sejm 1985–1989
Recipients of the Order of the Builders of People's Poland
Recipients of the Order of the Banner of Work